David S. Collins (born October 20, 1952) is a former outfielder in Major League Baseball from  to .

Collins is one of three players to have made it to the major leagues who played for the Rapid City Post 22 American Legion baseball program in Rapid City, South Dakota. The other two are Kelvin Torve and Mark Ellis. All three were graduates of Stevens High School in Rapid City. Collins currently holds the Toronto Blue Jays single season stolen base record with 60 steals in 1984.

Playing career

Minors

David S. Collins was drafted in the first round of the 1972 draft from Mesa Community College by the California Angels. Collins made his professional debut with the Angels Rookie ball team in Idaho Falls and moved up through the Angels farm system, with stops in Single-A Quad City and Salinas, Double-A El Paso and Triple-A Salt Lake City. Collins was dubbed "fastest white man in baseball" because he ran the 100-yard dash in 9.6 seconds and had high stolen base totals.

California Angels

Collins made his major league debut for the Angels on June 7, 1975, playing left field and batting leadoff, against the Milwaukee Brewers. Collins recorded his first career hit the following day against Brewers pitcher Tom Murphy.

Seattle Mariners

After two seasons as a utility player and reserve outfielder with the Angels, Collins was selected by the Seattle Mariners with the 14th pick in the 1976 Major League Baseball expansion draft. Collins was the first batter for the Mariners in their first game, and scored the franchise's first run two days later.

Cincinnati Reds

After that 1977 season, the Mariners traded Collins to the Cincinnati Reds for Shane Rawley, and Collins spent the subsequent four seasons with the Reds. Collins hit .318 in 1979 and .303 in 1980 (8th in National League) and also scored 94 runs (7th in National League) and stole 79 bases (3rd in National League).

New York Yankees

Collins was signed by the New York Yankees as a free agent prior to the 1982 season.

Toronto Blue Jays

Collins was traded by the Yankees, along with Mike Morgan, Fred McGriff and cash to the Toronto Blue Jays in 1983 for Tom Dodd and Dale Murray. Collins hit .271 and .308 in his two seasons in Toronto, and currently holds the Blue Jays single season stolen base record with 60 steals in 1984. Collins also led the American league with 15 triples hit in 1984.

Oakland A's

Collins was traded in December 1984 by the Blue Jays, along with Alfredo Griffin and cash, to the Oakland Athletics, in exchange for Bill Caudill. Collins hit .251 in 112 games for Oakland during the 1985 season.

Detroit Tigers

Collins was then traded to the Detroit Tigers for Bárbaro Garbey in November 1985. As a part-time outfielder with Detroit, Collins hit .270 and stole 27 bases.

Montreal Expos

Picked up by the Montreal Expos as a free agent after the season, Collins was cut during spring training.

Cincinnati Reds

Collins was signed by the Cincinnati Reds, with whom he had previously had the most success. Used as a fourth outfielder/pinch hitter by the Reds, Collins found some success, hitting .294 in 1987, but his average dropped to .236 in 1988. In 1989, he was released.

St. Louis Cardinals

Collins' last season was in 1990, with the St. Louis Cardinals, batting .224 in 99 games as a first baseman.

Career statistics
In 1701 games over 16 seasons, Collins compiled a .272 batting average (1335-for-4907) with 667 runs, 187 doubles, 52 triples, 32 home runs, 373 RBI, 395 stolen bases, 467 base on balls, 660 strikeouts, .338 on-base percentage and .351 slugging percentage. Defensively, Collins recorded a .986 fielding percentage at all three outfield positions and at first base. Tommy John thought Collins was a better player on Astroturf fields (like Riverfront Stadium) than natural grass fields (like Yankee Stadium).

Retirement

Collins played briefly for the Fort Myers Sun Sox of the Senior Professional Baseball Association. 

Collins has volunteered at the Lighthouse 
Correctional Facility, conducting one-hour motivational and life skills sessions to young offenders, with the hope of enhancing and changing their lives.

Coaching career
Collins coached for various MLB organization, and also coached the Inland Empire 66ers in 2007.  In addition to coaching at the Major and Minor League levels, Collins was also the head coach for Anna High School in Anna, Ohio, from 1992 to 1994.  Collins was the head baseball and basketball coach for Lake Orion High School in Lake Orion, Michigan, from 1996 to 1998.  In 2009, he was assistant coach for the Ontario Blue Jays 18U team. In 2018, Collins was an assistant coach at Miami University Hamilton, with focus on outfield and base running. As of 2019, Collins is an assistant coach at Indiana University Southeast.

See also
 List of Major League Baseball career stolen bases leaders
 List of St. Louis Cardinals coaches

References

External links

1952 births
Living people
American baseball players of Japanese descent
American expatriate baseball players in Canada
Baseball coaches from South Dakota
Baseball players from South Dakota
California Angels players
Cincinnati Reds coaches
Cincinnati Reds players
Colorado Rockies (baseball) coaches
El Paso Diablos players
Detroit Tigers players
Florida Marlins coaches
Fort Myers Sun Sox players
Idaho Falls Angels players
Major League Baseball first base coaches
Major League Baseball left fielders
Mesa Thunderbirds baseball players
Milwaukee Brewers coaches
Minor league baseball managers
Nashville Sounds players
New York Yankees players
Oakland Athletics players
Quad Cities Angels players
Salinas Packers players
Salt Lake City Gulls players
Seattle Mariners players
Sportspeople from Rapid City, South Dakota
St. Louis Cardinals coaches
St. Louis Cardinals players
Toronto Blue Jays players